Meir is a Jewish male given name and an occasional surname. It means "one who shines". It is often Germanized as Maier, Mayer, Mayr, Meier, Meyer, Meijer, Italianized as Miagro, or Anglicized as Mayer, Meyer, or Myer. Notable people with the name include:

Given name:
Rabbi Meir, Jewish sage who lived in the time of the Talmud
Meir Amit (1921–2009), Israeli general and politician
Meir Ariel, Israeli singer/songwriter
Meir Bar-Ilan (1880–1949), rabbi and Religious Zionism leader 
Meir Ben Baruch (1215–1293) aka Meir of Rothenburg, a German rabbi, poet, and author
Meir Daloya (born 1956), Olympic weightlifter
Meir Dizengoff (1861–1936), Israeli politician
Meir Har-Zion, Israeli commando fighter
Meir Dagan, Mossad chief
Meir Kahane (1932–1990), rabbi and political activist
Meir Lublin (1558–1616), Polish rabbi, Talmudist and Posek
Meir Nitzan, the mayor of Rishon-LeZion, Israel
Meir Pa'il (1926–2015), Israeli politician and military historian
Meir Shalev, Israeli writer
Meir Shamgar (born 1925), Israeli President of the Israeli Supreme Court
Meir Shapiro (1887–1933), Hasidic Rabbi and creator of the Daf Yomi
Meir Simcha of Dvinsk (1843–1926), rabbi and leader of Orthodox Judaism in Eastern Europe
Meir Zorea (1923–1995), Israeli general and politician
Meir Sheetrit, a current Israeli Knesset member for the Kadima party
 Meir Tapiro (born 1975), Israeli basketball player, and current CEO of Ironi Nes Ziona
Meir Tobianski (1904–1948), Israeli officer wrongly executed as a traitor
Israel Meir Kagan (1838–1933), Polish rabbi, Halakhist and ethicist
Yisrael Meir Lau, the Chief Rabbi of Tel Aviv, Israel 
Yitzchak Meir Alter (1798(?)–1866), Polish rabbi and founder of the Ger (Hasidic dynasty) within Hasidic Judaism

Surname:
Elchanan Meir (born 1936), Israeli psychologist
Gideon Meir, Israeli diplomat
Golda Meir (1898–1978), a founder of the modern State of Israel, Hebraicized from Meyerson
Jessica Meir, comparative physiology researcher and aquanaut
Nati Meir (born 1955), Romanian politician

Localities
Meir, Antwerp, shopping street in Antwerp, Belgium
Meir, Egypt
Meir, Staffordshire

See also

Meyr (disambiguation)
Meyer (disambiguation)
Myer (disambiguation)
Mayer (disambiguation)

References

 Jewish masculine given names
 Jewish surnames